is a one-shot Japanese manga written by Kan Furuyama and illustrated by Jiro Taniguchi. The manga is licensed for an English-language release in North America by Central Park Media, licensed for a French-language release in France, Italian-language release in Italy and Portuguese-language release in Brazil by Panini Comics and a Spanish-language release in Spain by Editorial Ivrea.

Manga
Akita Shoten released the manga's single tankōbon originally in September 1992; it was re-released on October 8, 2004. Panini Comics released the manga in France on October 12, 2006, in Italy on August 23, 2005 and in Brazil in June 2006.

Characters
Lord Mitsuyoshi/Yagyū Jūbei - the protagonist. He is the master of "Yagyu Shinkagery" sword style and the one responsible for guarding the Yagyu Secret Chronicles.
Lord Gomino - the main antagonist and the former emperor. He resides in Kyoto and attempts to start a rebellion against the Tokugawa bakufu which is the reason as to why he sent his lackey Yashamaro to steal the Yagyu Secret Chronicles.
Lord Rokumaru - Jubei's younger half-brother and chief monk of the Hotokuji Temple. He aides his brother in retrieving the Yagyu Secret Chronicles. 
Yashamaro - Gomino's ninja whom he sent to steal the Yagyu Secret Chronicles. He is Jubei's foe.
Yagyū Munenori - Jubei's father and katana instructor for the Shogun and watcher of all feudal lords. He is also the leader of the secret organization of Shadow Yagyu.
Lady Tsukinowanomiya called Miya-sama (it is one of the ways to address a Prince or Princess of the Imperial Family) - Gomizunono's daughter and granddaughter of Tokugawa Hidetada. She was once the Empress Myosho but retired. She is an old friend of Jubei.
Katsu Kaishū - the narrator of the story.

References

External links

Manga News review 
Manga Sanctuary review 

1992 manga
Adventure anime and manga
Akita Shoten manga
CPM Press
Jiro Taniguchi
Martial arts anime and manga
One-shot manga
Seinen manga